Man with a Plan may refer to:

Man with a Plan (film), a 1996 independent satire
Man with a Plan (TV series), a 2016 television sitcom starring Matt LeBlanc
"Man with a Plan", a 2013 television episode of Mad Men
Man with a Plan (album), a 1996 album by Carl Smith
 Man with a Plan, a 1992 album by Dennis Robbins
 Lincoln Loud, protagonist of The Loud House